Guerrero is one of the 67 municipalities of Chihuahua, in northern Mexico. The municipal seat lies at Vicente Guerrero (aka Ciudad Guerrero). The municipality covers an area of 5,603.6 km².

As of 2010, the municipality had a total population of 39,626, up from 37,249 as of 2005. 

The municipality had 822 localities, the largest of which (with 2010 populations in parentheses) were: La Junta (8,930), Vicente Guerrero (7,751), Tomochi (2,818), classified as urban, and Basúchil (1,451), and Orozco (San Isidro Pascual Orozco) (1,263), classified as rural.

Geography

Towns and villages
The municipality has 462 localities. The largest are:

Municipal presidents
 (1989 - 1992): Luis Moya Anchondo
 (1992 - 1995): Carlos Comadurán
 (1995 - 1998): Alonso Domínguez Carreón
 (1998 - 2001): Jesús Alfredo Velarde Guzmán
 (2001 - 2004): Jorge Morales Morales
 (2004 - 2007): Alonso Domínguez Carreón
 (2007 - 2010): José Gabriel Almeyda Ochoa

References

Municipalities of Chihuahua (state)